Paul Bloomfield (February 1946 – April 2016) was a British property investor known as "Boom-boom" Bloomfield.

Career
Bloomfield was involved with a string of high-profile deals during the 1980s and was known as the man that sourced the deals that made Tony Clegg's Mountleigh a stock market favourite in 1986-87.
 
In 1989, it emerged that he was the joint owner of the Alton Towers theme park and a leisure venture at Battersea Power Station after he formed a joint venture, Alton International, with John Broome of Alton Group. Broome was struggling to complete the Battersea project.

He became bankrupt during the 1990s property crash. He later moved to Russia where he made successful deals in the former Soviet states. He helped to raise the finance for the redevelopment of Wembley Stadium.

See also
Jan Bonde Nielsen
Mohammad Ghadami
Timur Kulibayev

References

External links
The Times article

British businesspeople
2016 deaths
1946 births